The 1932 Kentucky Derby was the 58th running of the Kentucky Derby. The race took place on May 7, 1932.

Full results

Payout

 The winner received a purse of $52,350 and a $5,000 Gold Cup.
 Second place received $6,000.
 Third place received $3,000.
 Fourth place received $1,000.

References

1932
Kentucky Derby
Derby
May 1932 sports events